The 1916 United States presidential election in Montana took place on November 7, 1916 a part of the 1916 United States presidential election. Voters chose four representatives, or electors to the Electoral College, who voted for president and vice president.

Montana overwhelmingly voted for the Democratic nominee, President Woodrow Wilson, over the Republican nominee, U.S. Supreme Court Justice and former New York Governor Charles Evans Hughes. Wilson won the state by a large margin of 19.31%.

Primary elections

Republican primary
The Republican primary took place on April 21, 1916. Iowa Senator Albert B. Cummins would convincingly win. Cummins would be one of two candidates on the ballot with favorite son, Edward Randolph Woods.

Democratic primary
The Democratic primary took place on April 21, 1916. Incumbent president, Woodrow Wilson, ran virtually unopposed in the Democratic primary.

Progressive primary
The Progressive primary took place on April 21, 1916. The two members of the ticket from 1912, Theodore Roosevelt and Hiram Johnson were the two major candidates.

Socialist primary
The Socialist primary took place on April 21, 1916. Eventual nominee and newspaper editor Allan L. Benson would receive all but one vote.

Results

Results by county

See also
 United States presidential elections in Montana

References

Montana
1916
1916 Montana elections